Anglo-Saxon runes ( ᚱᚢᚾᚪ) are runes used by the early Anglo-Saxons as an alphabet in their writing system. The characters are known collectively as the futhorc (ᚠᚢᚦᚩᚱᚳ fuþorc) from the Old English sound values of the first six runes. The futhorc was a development from the 24-character Elder Futhark. Since the futhorc runes are thought to have first been used in Frisia before the Anglo-Saxon settlement of Britain, they have also been called Anglo-Frisian runes. They were likely to have been used from the 5th century onward, recording Old English and Old Frisian.

They were gradually supplanted in Anglo-Saxon England by the Old English Latin alphabet introduced by missionaries. Futhorc runes were no longer in common use by the eleventh century, but The Byrhtferth Manuscript (MS Oxford St John's College 17) indicates that fairly accurate understanding of them persisted into at least the twelfth century.

History

There are competing theories about the origins of the Anglo-Saxon futhorc. One theory proposes that it was developed in Frisia and from there later spread to Britain. Another holds that runes were first introduced to Britain from the mainland where they were then modified and exported to Frisia. Both theories have their inherent weaknesses, and a definitive answer may come from further archaeological evidence.

The early futhorc was nearly identical to the Elder Futhark, except for the split of  a into three variants  āc,  æsc and  ōs, resulting in 26 runes. This was done to account for the new phoneme produced by the Ingvaeonic split of allophones of long and short a. The earliest known instance of the  ōs rune may be from the 5th-century, on the Undley bracteate. The earliest known instances of the  āc rune may be from the 6th century, appearing on objects such as the Schweindorf solidus. The double-barred  hægl characteristic of continental inscriptions is first attested as late as 698, on St Cuthbert's coffin; before that, the single-barred variant was used.

In England, outside of the Brittonic Westcountry where evidence of Latin and even Ogham continued for several centuries, usage of the futhorc expanded. Runic writing in England became closely associated with the Latin scriptoria from the time of Anglo-Saxon Christianization in the 7th century. The futhorc started to be replaced by the Latin alphabet from around the 7th century, but it was still sometimes used up until the 10th or 11th century. In some cases, texts would be written in the Latin alphabet, and þorn and ƿynn came to be used as extensions of the Latin alphabet. By the time of the Norman Conquest of 1066, it was very rare and disappeared altogether a few centuries thereafter. From at least five centuries of use, fewer than 200 artefacts bearing futhorc inscriptions have survived.

Several famous English examples mix runes and Roman script, or Old English and Latin, on the same object, including the Franks Casket and St Cuthbert's coffin; in the latter, three of the names of the Four Evangelists are given in Latin written in runes, but "LUKAS" (Saint Luke) is in Roman script. The coffin is also an example of an object created at the heart of the Anglo-Saxon church that uses runes. A leading expert, Raymond Ian Page, rejects the assumption often made in non-scholarly literature that runes were especially associated in post-conversion Anglo-Saxon England with Anglo-Saxon paganism or magic.

Letters

The letter sequence and letter inventory of futhorc, along with the actual sounds made by those letters could vary depending on location and time. That being so, an authentic and unified list of runes is not possible.

Rune inventory

The sequence of the runes above is based on Codex Vindobonensis 795. The first 24 of these runes directly continue the elder futhark letters, and do not deviate in sequence (though ᛞᛟ rather than ᛟᛞ is an attested sequence in both elder futhark and futhorc). The manuscripts Codex Sangallensis 878 and Cotton MS Domitian A IX have ᚣ precede ᛠ.

The names of the runes above are based on Codex Vindobonensis 795, besides the names ing and æsc which come from The Byrhtferth's Manuscript and replace the seemingly corrupted names lug and æs found in Codex Vindobonensis 795. Ti is sometimes named tir or tyr in other manuscripts. The words in parentheses in the name column are standardized spellings.

The runes above were not included in Codex Vindobonensis 795. Calc appears in manuscripts, and epigraphically on the Ruthwell Cross, the Bramham Moor Ring, the Kingmoor Ring, and elsewhere. Gar appears in manuscripts, and epigraphically on the Ruthwell Cross and probably on the Bewcastle Cross. The unnamed ᛤ rune only appears on the Ruthwell Cross, where it seems to take calc's place as /k/ where that consonant is followed by a secondary fronted vowel. Cweorð and stan only appear in manuscripts. The unnamed ę rune only appears on the Baconsthorpe Grip. The unnamed į rune only appears on the Sedgeford Handle. While the rune poem and Cotton Domitian A.IX present ᛡ as "ior", and ᛄ as "ger", epigraphically both are variants of ger (although ᛄ is only attested once outside of manuscripts, on the Brandon Pin). R. I. Page designated ior a pseudo-rune.

There is little doubt that calc and gar are modified forms of cen and gyfu, and that they were invented to address the ambiguity which arose from /k/ and /g/ spawning palatalized offshoots. R. I. Page designated cweorð and stan pseudo-runes, noting their apparent pointlessness, and speculating that cweorð was invented merely to give futhorc an equivalent to Q. The ę rune is likely a local innovation, possibly representing an unstressed vowel, and may derive its shape from ᛠ. The unnamed į rune is found in a personal name (bįrnferþ), where it stands for a vowel or diphthong. Anglo-Saxon expert Gaby Waxenberger speculates that į may not be a true rune, but rather a bindrune of ᛁ and ᚩ, or the result of a mistake.

Combinations and digraphs
Various runic combinations are found in the futhorc corpus. For example, the sequence ᚫᚪ appears on the Mortain Casket where ᛠ could theoretically have been used.

Usage and culture
A rune in Old English could be called a rūnstæf (perhaps meaning something along the lines of "mystery letter" or "whisper letter"), or simply rūn.

Futhorc inscriptions hold diverse styles and contents. Ochre has been detected on at least one English runestone, implying its runes were once painted. Bind runes are not uncommon in futhorc (relative to its small corpus), and were seemingly used most often to ensure the runes would fit in a limited space. Futhorc logography is attested to in a few manuscripts. This was done by having a rune stand for its name, or a similar sounding word. In the sole extant manuscript of the poem Beowulf, the ēðel rune was used as a logogram for the word ēðel (meaning "homeland", or "estate"). Both the Hackness Stone and Codex Vindobonensis 795 attest to futhorc Cipher runes. In one manuscript (Corpus Christi College, MS 041) a writer seems to have used futhorc runes like Roman numerals, writing ᛉᛁᛁ⁊ᛉᛉᛉᛋᚹᛁᚦᚩᚱ, which likely means "12&30 more".

There is some evidence of futhorc rune magic. The possibly magical alu sequence seems to appear on an urn found at Spong Hill in spiegelrunes (runes whose shapes are mirrored). In a tale from Bede's Ecclesiastical History (written in Latin), a man named Imma cannot be bound by his captors and is asked if he is using "litteras solutorias" (loosening letters) to break his binds. In one Old English translation of the passage, Imma is asked if he is using "drycraft" (magic, druidcraft) or "runestaves" to break his binds. Furthermore, futhorc rings have been found with what appear to be enchanted inscriptions for the stanching of blood.

Inscription corpus

The Old English and Old Frisian Runic Inscriptions database project at the Catholic University of Eichstätt-Ingolstadt, Germany aims at collecting the genuine corpus of Old English inscriptions containing more than two runes in its paper edition, while the electronic edition aims at including both genuine and doubtful inscriptions down to single-rune inscriptions.

The corpus of the paper edition encompasses about one hundred objects (including stone slabs, stone crosses, bones, rings, brooches, weapons, urns, a writing tablet, tweezers, a sun-dial, comb, bracteates, caskets, a font, dishes, and graffiti).
The database includes, in addition, 16 inscriptions containing a single rune, several runic coins, and 8 cases of dubious runic characters (runelike signs, possible Latin characters, weathered characters). Comprising fewer than 200 inscriptions, the corpus is slightly larger than that of Continental Elder Futhark (about 80 inscriptions, c. 400–700), but slightly smaller than that of the Scandinavian Elder Futhark (about 260 inscriptions, c. 200–800).

Runic finds in England cluster along the east coast with a few finds scattered further inland in Southern England. Frisian finds cluster in West Frisia. Looijenga (1997) lists 23 English (including two 7th-century Christian inscriptions) and 21 Frisian inscriptions predating the 9th century.

Currently known inscriptions in Anglo-Frisian runes include:

{| role="presentation" class="wikitable mw-collapsible mw-collapsed"
| FRISIAN
|-
|* Ferwerd combcase, 6th century; me uræ
|-
|* Amay comb, c. 600; eda
|-
|* Oostyn comb, 8th century; aib ka[m]bu / deda habuku (with a triple-barred h)
|-
|* Toornwerd comb, 8th century; kabu
|-
|* Skanomody solidus, 575–610; skanomodu
|-
|* Harlingen solidus, 575–625, hada (two ac runes, double-barred h)
|-
|* Schweindorf solidus, 575–625, wela[n]du "Weyland" (or þeladu; running right to left)
|-
|* Folkestone tremissis, c. 650; æniwulufu
|-
|* Midlum sceat, c.  750; æpa
|-
|* Rasquert swordhandle (whalebone handle of a symbolic sword), late 8th century; ek [u]mædit oka, "I, Oka, not made mad" (compare ek unwodz from the Danish corpus)
|-
|* Arum sword, a yew-wood miniature sword, late 8th century; edæboda
|-
|* Westeremden A, a yew weaving-slay; adujislume[þ]jisuhidu
|-
|* Westeremden B, a yew-stick, 8th century; oph?nmuji?adaamluþ / :wimœ?ahþu?? / iwio?u?du?ale|-
|* Britsum yew-stick; þkniaberetdud / ]n:bsrsdnu; the k has Younger Futhark shape and probably represents a vowel.
|-
|* Hantum whalebone plate; [.]:aha:k[; the reverse side is inscribed with Roman ABA.
|-
|* Bernsterburen whalebone staff, c. 800; tuda æwudu kius þu tuda|-
|* Hamwic horse knucklebone, dated to between 650 and 1025; katæ (categorised as Frisian on linguistic grounds, from *kautōn "knucklebone")
|-
|* Wijnaldum B gold pendant, c. 600; hiwi|-
|* Kantens combcase, early 5th century; li|-
|* Hoogebeintum comb, c. 700; [...]nlu / ded|-
|* Wijnaldum A antler piece; zwfuwizw[...]|}

Related manuscript texts

 Codex Sangallensis 270 — lists runes with their names, and explains how to use certain rune ciphers
 Codex Sangallensis 878 — contains a presentation of Anglo-Saxon runes
 Codex Vindobonensis 795 — contains a description of Anglo-Saxon runes
 Cotton Domitian A.IX — lists runes with their names
 Cotton Otho B.x.165 — contained the Old English rune poem before being destroyed in a fire
 Cotton Vitellius A.XII — lists runes in alphabetical order
 The Byrhtferth's Manuscript MS 17 — contains a table of runic, cryptographic, and exotic alphabets

See also
 Elder Futhark
 List of runestones
 Ogham
 Old English Latin alphabet
 Runic alphabet
 Younger Futhark

Notes

References
 .
 .
 .
 
 J. H. Looijenga, Runes around the North Sea and on the Continent AD 150–700, dissertation,  Groningen University (1997).
 Odenstedt, Bengt, On the Origin and Early History of the Runic Script, Uppsala (1990), ; chapter 20: 'The position of continental and Anglo-Frisian runic forms in the history of the older futhark '
 
 
 
 Frisian runes and neighbouring traditions, Amsterdamer Beiträge zur älteren Germanistik 45 (1996).
H. Marquardt, Die Runeninschriften der Britischen Inseln'' (Bibliographie der Runeninschriften nach Fundorten, Bd. I), Abhandlungen der Akademie der Wissenschaften in Göttingen, Phil.-hist. Klasse, dritte Folge, Nr. 48, Göttingen 1961, pp. 10–16.

Further reading

External links
Anglo-Saxon Runic Texts at Georgetown Univ
Early Runic Inscriptions in England
Portable Antiquities Scheme (has information on runic artefacts from England)
Presenter: The Ruthwell Cross (3D rendering of the Ruthwell Cross)
The Byrhtferth's Manuscript

 
Old English